Sergei Faritovich Zangareev (born 3 October 1980) is a former football midfielder from Russia.

Zangareev previously played for Lisma-Mordoviya Saransk in the Russian Football National League and FC Lada Togliatti in the Russian Second Division.

Playing career

* - played games and goals

Awards
 Champion of Latvia - 2006

References

1980 births
Living people
Russian footballers
FC Lada-Tolyatti players
FK Ventspils players
Russian expatriate footballers
Expatriate footballers in Latvia
Russian expatriate sportspeople in Latvia
FC Mordovia Saransk players
FC Gornyak Uchaly players
FC Armavir players
Association football midfielders
FC Zhemchuzhina Sochi players
FC Mashuk-KMV Pyatigorsk players